A damped wave was an early method of radio transmission produced by the first radio transmitters (spark gap transmitters) which consisted of a series of damped radio waves.  Information was carried on this signal by telegraphy, turning the transmitter on and off (on-off keying) to send messages in Morse code. Damped waves were the first practical means of radio communication, used during the wireless telegraphy era which ended around 1920. In radio engineering it is now generally referred to as "Class B" emission.

Such transmissions have a wide bandwidth and generate electrical "noise" (electromagnetic interference) which interferes with other radio transmissions. Because of their potential to cause interference and their resulting wasteful use of radio spectrum resources, there is an international prohibition against the use of class B damped wave radio emissions (except in the USA under Part 15: "§15.521   Technical requirements applicable to all UWB devices. (i) The prohibition in §2.201(f) and 15.5(d) of this chapter against Class B (damped wave) emissions does not apply to UWB devices operating under this subpart."), established by the International Telecommunication Union in 1938.
However the definition of "damped waves" in these regulations is unclear when applied to modern technology, and recently there have been moves to amend this prohibition to exempt emerging radio technologies such as ultra-wideband transmission systems.

See also 
 Continuous wave
 Damping ratio
 On-off keying
 Amplitude modulation
 Types of radio emissions

References

External links 
 Sparks Telegraph Key Review A complete listing with photos of damped wave telegraph keys (spark keys) by manufacturer.
 47cfr2.201 FCC rules where "Type B damped wave emissions" are forbidden. 

Radio modulation modes